Scalabrini Ortiz Station is a station on Line D of the Buenos Aires Underground. The station was opened on 23 February 1940 as part of the extension of Line D from Tribunales to Palermo.

It is located at the intersection of  Avenida Santa Fe and Avenida Scalabrini Ortiz.

It was initially known as "Canning", after the nearby avenue, which was in turn named after the British minister George Canning. The avenue was renamed as Raúl Scalabrini Ortiz in 1974, during the government of Juan Perón. The National Reorganization Process restored the initial name in 1976, and renamed it as "2 de abril" during the Falklands War. The name "Scalabrini Ortiz" was restored once more in 1985, during the presidency of Raúl Alfonsín, and keeps being used to this day.

Gallery

References

External links

Buenos Aires Underground stations
1940 establishments in Argentina